The Fighting Buckaroo is a lost 1926 American silent Western film directed by Roy William Neill and starring Buck Jones, Sally Long and Lloyd Whitlock.

Cast
 Buck Jones as Larry Crawford 
 Sally Long as Betty Gregory 
 Lloyd Whitlock as Glenmore Bradley 
 Frank Butler as Percy M. Wellington 
 E.J. Ratcliffe as Judge Richard Gregory 
 Ben Hendricks Jr. as First Crook 
 Ray Thompson as Second Crook 
 Frank Rice as Any Parker

References

Bibliography
 Solomon, Aubrey. The Fox Film Corporation, 1915-1935: A History and Filmography. McFarland, 2011.

External links
 

1926 films
1926 Western (genre) films
1920s English-language films
Fox Film films
Films directed by Roy William Neill
American black-and-white films
Silent American Western (genre) films
1920s American films